Harry Raymond "Spike" LaRoss (January 2, 1888 – March 22, 1954) was a Major League Baseball outfielder who played for the Cincinnati Reds in .

External links

Cincinnati Reds players
Major League Baseball outfielders
1888 births
1954 deaths
Baseball players from Pennsylvania
Sportspeople from Easton, Pennsylvania
Winchester Hustlers players
Battle Creek Crickets players
Terre Haute Hottentots players
South Bend Benders players
Peoria Distillers players
Beaumont Oilers players
Charleston Palmettos players
Redfield Reds players
Fargo Athletics players